The 2019–20 season was SD Eibar's sixth straight season in La Liga. They also participated in the Copa del Rey.

Players

Reserve team

Transfers

In

Out

Net totals

Summer: 9,900,000 €

Winter: 0,000,000 €

Total: 9,900,000 €

Statistics

Appearances and goals

|-
! colspan=14 style=background:#dcdcdc; text-align:center|Goalkeepers

|-
! colspan=14 style=background:#dcdcdc; text-align:center|Defenders

|-
! colspan=14 style=background:#dcdcdc; text-align:center|Midfielders

|-
! colspan=14 style=background:#dcdcdc; text-align:center|Forwards

|-
! colspan=14 style=background:#dcdcdc; text-align:center| Players who have made an appearance or had a squad number this season but have left the club

|-
|}

Pre-season and friendlies

Competitions

Overview

La Liga

League table

Results summary

Results by round

Matches
The La Liga schedule was announced on 4 July 2019.

Copa del Rey

References

External links

SD Eibar seasons
Eibar